The châteaux of the Loire Valley are part of the architectural heritage of the historic towns of Amboise, Angers, Blois, Chinon, Montsoreau, Orléans, Saumur, and Tours along the river Loire in France. They illustrate Renaissance ideals of design in France.

The châteaux of the Loire Valley number over three hundred, ranging from practical fortified castles from the 10th century to splendid residences built half a millennium later. When the French kings began constructing their huge châteaux in the Loire Valley, the nobility, drawn to the seat of power, followed suit, attracting the finest architects and landscape designers. The châteaux and their surrounding gardens are cultural monuments which embody the ideals of the Renaissance and Enlightenment. Many of the châteaux were built on hilltops, such as the Château d'Amboise, while the only one built in the riverbed is the Château de Montsoreau. Many had exquisite churches on the grounds or within the château.

History
With the Hundred Years' War concluded, Charles VII, Louis XI, and their successors preferred to spend the bulk of their time in the "garden of France" along the banks of the Loire. In the late 15th century Tours, then Blois, and later Amboise became the preferred locations of the French royal court. Many courtiers bought dilapidated castles built by the medieval Counts of Blois and of Anjou, and they had them reconstructed in the latest Italianate fashion. Leonardo da Vinci and other Italian artists arrived to design and beautify these residences.

In the 16th century, Francis I moved his main residence back to the Louvre, in Paris. With him went the great architects, but the Loire Valley continued to be the place where French royalty preferred to spend their time when not in the capital. Toward the end of the 17th century, Louis XIV made the Île-de-France the permanent locale for great royal residences when he built the Palace of Versailles. Nonetheless, those who gained the king's favour, as well as the wealthy bourgeoisie, continued to renovate existing châteaux or build lavish new ones in the Loire Valley as summer residences.

The French Revolution saw a number of the great châteaux destroyed and many ransacked, their treasures stolen. The overnight impoverishment of many French noble families, usually after one of their members lost his or her head to the guillotine, saw many châteaux demolished. During World War I and World War II, various chateaux were commandeered as military headquarters. Some of these continued to be so used after the end of World War II.

Today, the remaining privately owned châteaux serve as homes and some of them open their doors to tourists, while others operate as hotels or bed-and-breakfasts. Many others have been taken over by local governments, and the grandest, like those at Chambord, are owned and operated by the national government and are major tourist sites, attracting hundreds of thousands of visitors each year.

List of châteaux of the Loire 
Though there may be no universally accepted definition for the designation, the main criterion is that the château must be situated close to the Loire or one of its tributaries (such as the Maine, Cher, Indre, Creuse or Loir). Châteaux further upstream than Gien are generally not included, with the possible exception of the Bastie d'Urfé for its historical significance.

Royal châteaux

Châteaux of the nobility

Other châteaux

Map

See also

List of châteaux in France
Tuffeau, principal building material of the Loire Valley

References

External links

Châteaux de la Loire, Finest France

 
 
Renaissance architecture in France
World Heritage Sites in France